Canyonville Methodist Church (Canyonville United Methodist Church) is a historic church at 2nd and Pine Streets in Canyonville, Oregon. It was built in 1868, and added to the National Register of Historic Places in 1984.

References

Methodist churches in Oregon
Churches on the National Register of Historic Places in Oregon
Neoclassical architecture in Oregon
Churches completed in 1868
Buildings and structures in Douglas County, Oregon
National Register of Historic Places in Douglas County, Oregon
1868 establishments in Oregon
Canyonville, Oregon
Neoclassical church buildings in the United States